Sarojini Gogte née Apte (born 1942) is a former badminton player from India.

Career
Gogte has won two individual and three doubles titles at Indian National Badminton Championship, with her sister Sunila Apte.

References

Indian female badminton players
Indian national badminton champions
Living people
1942 births
Marathi people
Sportswomen from Maharashtra
Racket sportspeople from Maharashtra
20th-century Indian women
20th-century Indian people